George Delmetia Beauchamp (March 18, 1899 – March 30, 1941) was an American inventor of musical instruments. He is known for designing the first electrically amplified stringed instrument to be marketed commercially. He was also a founder of National Stringed Instrument Corporation and Rickenbacker (originally Rickenbacher) guitars.

Biography
 
He was born in Coleman County, Texas on March 18, 1899. Beauchamp performed in vaudeville, playing the violin and the lap steel guitar, before he settled in Los Angeles, California. During the 1920s, he experimented with the creation of electric lap steel guitars, electric guitars, electric bass guitars, electric violins, and instrument amplifiers. In 1931, he joined with Paul Barth and Adolph Rickenbacker to form the Ro-Pat-In Corporation to produce and sell electrified string instruments. The most notable of these, the Rickenbacher A-22 (and A-25) lapsteel guitar – known as the "frying pan" – is widely regarded as the first mass-produced electric guitar. Production of the instrument began in 1932. In 1937, Beauchamp secured a United States patent for his version of the electric guitar.

Beauchamp married Myrtle Johnston in 1917. They had two children, Frances and Nolan. He died of a heart attack in 1941 while deep sea fishing near Los Angeles.

Inventions 
1929: Patent applied for the single-cone dobro guitar, patent #1,808,756 
1930: Patent applied for metal finger picks (now commonly used for steel guitars and banjos), patent #1,787,136 
1934: Patent applied for the electric lap steel guitar (nicknamed "the frying pan"), patent #2,089,171 
1936: Patent applied for the electric guitar (called the electro Spanish guitar, which was a hollow-body electric guitar), patent #2152783 
1936: Patent applied for the electric violin  (called the electro violin), patent #2130174 

Catalogues from the Electro String Instrument Corporation show a range of electric instruments. In 1932, Beauchamp's Ro-Pat-In company marketed the electric lap steel guitar. The electric guitar was supposedly marketed the same year; early catalogues showing the instrument are not dated.

References

Rickenbacker by Richard Smith (1988)

External links
Rickenbacker: The Earliest Days of the Electric Guitar
Which Came First- Electric Guitar or Amp?
Digital Violin - Article examining Beauchamp's Electro violins
2014 thesis by Matthew Hill, George Beauchamp and the rise of the electric guitar up to 1939

1899 births
1941 deaths
American luthiers
Vaudeville performers
20th-century American inventors